The CECAFA U-15 Championship is a football tournament organized by CECAFA. Held for the first time in 2019, it includes national under 15 teams from East and Central Africa.

Past winners

References

CECAFA competitions